Garra elegans, previously  Hemigrammocapoeta elegans, is a species of cyprinid fish. It is a benthopelagic freshwater species endemic to the Euphrates – Tigris basin in Western Asia.

References 

Hemigrammocapoeta
Fish described in 1868
Taxa named by Albert Günther